I'd Rather Go Blonde is Irish singer-songwriter Eleanor McEvoy’s eighth studio album. The album features eleven tracks, nine of which were written by McEvoy, one of which being co-written with former Beautiful South member Dave Rotheray, and a cover of the song Good Times by Sam Cooke.

In the album, McEvoy discusses alienation, hypocrisy, recent Irish history, and romance.

As McEvoy said, “I always try to express myself clearly and honestly. I was the odd one, the tubby girl with glasses who had to go to violin lessons after school. The ray of sunlight was the radio with its music. The escape was learning to sing and play instruments and play with others and write and just get out there."

Throughout her career, McEvoy has earned accolades and picked up various awards – not just for her work, but also for the high-end audio approach she has taken on her various albums. Alongside standard CD format, I’d Rather Go Blonde has been released as a 12 track stereo hybrid SACD/CD, and on vinyl.

Critical reception

From the Sept. 2010 Maverick Magazine: Absolutely stunning album has really blown me away. Featuring eleven new songs, nine penned by McEvoy and one co write with Beautiful South's David Rotheray finally a cover of Sam Cooke's Good Times, this is Eleanor McEvoy's eighth album spanning a twenty-year career, in which time she has established herself as one of Ireland's most accomplished singer-songwriters adopting an honest and open approach to writing that often tackles issues many would shy away from....This absolutely stunning album, has been a real find – one of the most compelling female singer-songwriters I’ve heard in a long time. And from Get Ready to ROCK!, Eight albums in, and Eleanor McEvoy has yet to put a foot wrong...of course, it wouldn't be an Eleanor McEvoy album without her wonderfully rich vocals and in that department, I'd Rather Go Blonde doesn't disappoint.

Band members

Ross Turner, born in Dublin, is a drummer with the award-winning Irish electronic rock band Jape. He has played with various bands including One Day International and Cathy Davey. He is currently recording under the name I Am The Cosmos.
Gavin Fox was born in Dublin and is the bass player in Concerto for Constantine. He has also been in the band Vega4, Scottish rock band Idlewild, and Irish indie rock band Turn.
Dubliner Peter Beckett is one of Ireland's leading arrangers. For 20 years he has worked in theatre as a musical director while outside the theatre he has worked as a freelance musician playing keyboards and guitar. He co-produced and arranged Love Must Be Tough featuring his own The King Street Band and co-produced and arranged Oh Uganda from the album Singled Out.
Gerry O’Connor, aka Gerry ‘Banjo’ O’Connor, is a native of Co. Tipperary. Described by the Wall Street Journal as “The best ever banjoist in the history of Irish music”. He has played with Chris Rea, Damien Dempsey and Sharon Shannon amongst others. As well as having three solo albums to his name, he is a member of the popular Irish band Four Men and a Dog.
Patrick Burke was a member of the Palestrina Choir for ten years under the direction of Ite O'Donovan. More recently, he was bass player for a number of years with Dublin band Jalopy. Sound engineering credits include The Gospel Project's album On the Outside, which featured a version of McEvoy's song Something So Wonderful.
Ciarán Byrne became the house engineer in the legendary Windmill Lane studios in Dublin in 1988, working on Van Morrison and The Chieftains Celtic Heartbeat album, U2’s Rattle & Hum and Achtung Baby. He is much in demand for traditional Irish music working with Cooney and Begley and Liam O’Flynn, and has worked with some of the world's top producers including Daniel Lanois, Pat McCarthy and Jimmy Iovine. I'd Rather Go Blonde is his fourth collaboration with McEvoy. He is currently co-owner of The Cauldron studios in Dublin
Ruadhri Cushnan mixed Mumford & Sons debut album Sigh No More which went double platinum in the UK (staying more than 6 months in the top 10 UK album charts). Cushnan has just completed mixing KT Tunstall’s new album Tiger Suit. Cushnan started out as an engineer at Metropolis studios in London, working with Queen, Ray Charles, Robert Plant, Björk, Neneh Cherry, All Saints, Sugababes and also worked as George Michael’s producer for a number of years.

Track listings

References

Eleanor McEvoy albums
2010 albums